Ted Benton is a British academic.

Career
As an academic, Benton works as an emeritus professor of sociology at the University of Essex. He has taught subjects such as social theory and environmental social science for more than forty years.

His most notable boook is Philosophical Foundations of the Three Sociologies, published by Routledge and was reviewed in Acta Sociologica in 1979 and in the American Journal of Sociology.

In 2007, he received the Stamford Raffles Award given by the Zoological Society of London.

Benton has reviewed books for Sage Journals.

Books
 Philosophical Foundations of the Three Sociologies (1977)
 The Rise and Fall of Structural Marxism (1984)
 Natural Relations (1993)
 Philosophy of Social Science (2001)
 The Butterflies of Colchester and North East Essex (2002)
 The Easy Butterfly Guide: Britain and Europe (2006)
 The SAGE Handbook of Environment and Society (2007)
 Nature, Social Relations and Human Needs (2009)
 Alfred Russel Wallace: Explorer, Evolutionist, Public Intellectual (2013)
 A Naturalist's Guide to the Butterflies of Great Britain and Northern Europe (2017)
 Solitary Bees (2017)

Awards
 Stamford Raffles Award

References

British sociologists
Academics of the University of Essex
Living people
Year of birth missing (living people)